A myeon, myŏn, myon, or township is an administrative unit in South Korea similar to the unit of town.

Along with town, township is of a county and some cities of fewer than 500,000 population. Myeon have smaller populations than towns and represent the rural areas of a county or city. Townships are subdivided into villages. The minimum population limit is 6,000.

See also
Administrative divisions of South Korea

References